The Gnevny class were a group of 29 destroyers built for the Soviet Navy in the late 1930s. They are sometimes known as the Gremyashchiy class and the official Soviet designation was Project 7. These ships fought in World War II.

In the early 1930s the Soviets felt able to restart construction of fleet destroyers and forty-eight ships were ordered under the Second Five-Year Plan.

The design was produced with Italian assistance despite ideological differences between the Soviets and Fascist Italy. They resembled contemporary destroyers built in Italy for the Greek and Turkish navies.

They suffered from some of the same weaknesses of contemporary Italian ships with structural weakness and limited seaworthiness. There were also significant machinery problems in the earliest ships. The design flaws were apparent after trials of the first units in 1936-1937 and production stopped after 29 ships. A modified design was then placed into production as the Type 7U.

Four surviving ships from the Pacific Fleet were transferred to the People's Liberation Army Navy and served as the s.

Design and description

Having decided on the specifications of the large   destroyer leaders, the Soviet Navy sought Italian assistance in designing smaller and cheaper destroyers.

Their crew numbered 197 officers and sailors in peacetime and 236 in wartime.

The designers had been conservative in rating the turbines and many, but not all, of the ships handily exceeded their designed speed during their sea trials. Others fell considerably short of it;  reached  during her trials in 1943.

Armament and fire control
As built, the Gnevny-class ships mounted four 50-caliber  B-13 guns in two pairs of superfiring single mounts fore and aft of the superstructure. Each gun was provided with 150 rounds. The development of the gun was troubled by excessive barrel erosion problems and three variants were built in a not entirely successful effort to resolve the problem which complicated logistical and operational support as each performed slightly differently. The manually operated mounts had an elevation range between −5° to +45° and had a rate of fire of 6–10 rounds per minute.

Anti-aircraft defense was provided by two 55-caliber  34-K AA guns and two 46-caliber  21-K AA guns, all in single mounts as well as a pair of  DK or DShK machine guns. The 34-K guns could elevate between −5° and +85°, had a rate of fire of fire of 15–20 rounds per minute, and the ships carried 300 rounds per gun for them. The 21-K was a converted anti-tank gun with a rate of fire of 25–30 rounds per minute with an elevation range between −10° and +85°. The Project 7s stowed 500 rounds for each gun.

The ships were equipped with six  torpedo tubes in two rotating triple mounts amidships; each tube was provided with a reload. The Project 7-class ships primarily used the 53-38 or the 53-38U torpedo, which differed only in the size of their warhead; the latter had a warhead  heavier than the  warhead of the 53-38. The ships could also carry a maximum of either 60 or 95 mines and 25 depth charges.

Fire control for the main battery of the Gnevnys was provided by a Mina-7 fire-control system that was derived from an Italian Galileo system. It included a TsAS-2 mechanical analog computer that received information from a KDP2-4 gunnery director on the roof of the bridge which mounted a pair of DM-4  stereoscopic rangefinders. Anti-aircraft fire control was strictly manual with only a DM-3  rangefinder to provide data to the guns.

Ships

Black Sea Fleet

Baltic Fleet

Pacific Fleet
All the Pacific Fleet ships were built by Dalzavod, Komsomolsk na Amure and towed to Vladivostok for fitting out due to the shallow depth of the Amur River. One unit, Reshitelny (i), was lost by stranding on passage 7 November 1938, being damaged beyond repair. The material for these ships was assembled in Nikolayev and then shipped east via the Trans-Siberian railway.

Citations

Sources

 

 

 

Destroyer classes
 
World War II destroyers of the Soviet Union
Italy–Soviet Union relations